Transit City was a plan for developing public transport in Toronto, Ontario, Canada. It was first proposed and announced on 16 March 2007 by then-Toronto Mayor David Miller and Chair of the Toronto Transit Commission (TTC) Adam Giambrone. The plan called for the construction of seven new light rail lines along the streets of seven priority transit corridors, which would have eventually been integrated with existing rapid transit, streetcar, and bus routes. Other transit improvements outlined in the plan included upgrading and extending the Scarborough RT line, implementing new bus rapid transit lines, and improving frequency and timing of 21 key bus routes. The plan integrated public transportation objectives outlined in the City of Toronto Official Plan, the TTC Ridership Growth Strategy and Miller's 2006 election platform.

Since the official announcement of the plan, preliminary engineering work and environmental impact assessments were done for the construction of the light rail lines. Public meetings were held to generate community discussion. The plan was initially reported to be funded by both municipal and provincial levels of government. However, the Government of Ontario postponed a portion of its capital funding to Transit City, which met with much public and political controversy, resulting in changes to construction plans and delayed start dates. Construction of one of the lines began in December 2009.

On 1 December 2010, Mayor Rob Ford took office saying that the first job of the new transit commission, to be appointed on 8 December, would be to "stop spending money on a project we don't need anymore". Ford campaigned on a platform proposing expansion of the subway system, instead of implementing light rail lines. Ford acknowledged that he would need council's support to put an end to Transit City. In early 2012, Toronto City Council voted in favour of motions to resume work on the Sheppard, Eglinton and Finch LRT lines and replace the Scarborough RT, defeating Rob Ford's campaign for subways. The master agreement for these lines was signed on 28 November 2012. While these projects were originally proposed under Transit City, they are now part of Metrolinx's implementation of The Big Move regional transportation plan.

Projects

The plan proposed  of tram or electric light rail along seven routes. The proposed network would carry 175 million riders a year, of which 75 million would be new Toronto Transit Commission (TTC) users. The seven proposed corridors were divided into two project priority phases: current and planned. In May 2009, Metrolinx CEO Robert Prichard announced that after further study, the proposed project was being scaled down, with shortened routes or deferrals to fit within the dedicated provincial funding for Transit City, not factoring in the province's March 2010 announcement that it was deferring $4 billion in funding.

The TTC was prepared to fund the entire cost of the network over a longer period of time. The highest priority was assigned to the Sheppard East, Eglinton Crosstown LRT and Etobicoke–Finch West LRT lines, and to the revitalization of the Scarborough RT line, which was projected to be built by 2020. In addition to the mentioned lines, it was likely that some sort of link would be established between the two lines, so that they could share a single storage facility. The TTC completed the environmental impact assessments for most of these lines, the first one being completed for the Sheppard East line. The construction of this line commenced in December 2009 but was stopped a year later by newly elected mayor Rob Ford.

Light rail transit
The following routes were to be constructed and opened by 2020.  Development on the Scarborough RT line was also considered to be priority (see below).

Sheppard East LRT: This line would run along Sheppard Avenue East from Don Mills Station via the future Sheppard East RT station on the Scarborough RT line, ending at a planned storage facility at Conlins Road, just east of Morningside Avenue. The line was to be constructed approx. 5 km further east to Meadowvale Road, but that portion was postponed as a result of the provincial funding cuts. Construction for the line began in December 2009 with official groundbreaking by Toronto Mayor David Miller. The line would serve the Sheppard East Village, a commercial neighbourhood along Sheppard Avenue East. An extension of the line northwards to the Toronto Zoo was being considered. Under construction since 2009, the line was expected to be completed and opened in 2014, the first of the seven lines. In June 2012 the province of Ontario announced that construction of the Sheppard East LRT would not resume until 2017 or finish until 2021. By 2017, planning for the line was shelved indefinitely.
Etobicoke–Finch West LRT: This line would run along Finch Avenue West, from Humber College North Campus to the future Finch West subway station on Line 1 Yonge–University. The plan was to keep the line's eastern terminus at Finch subway station and later extend the line to Don Mills subway station, providing a continuous route with the Sheppard East LRT, but this plan was postponed as a result of provincial funding cuts. Construction for its current route was expected to be completed by 2019 but delays in funding have postponed this to at least 2023.
Eglinton Crosstown LRT: The longest of the proposed corridors, this line would extend over  along Eglinton Avenue, from Kennedy subway station to Pearson International Airport. The road between Keele Street and Laird Drive was deemed too narrow for a right-of-way, so the line would run in a tunnel (with underground stations), much like the cancelled Eglinton West subway line. The entire planned route was originally expected to be completed by 2020. The western section between Mount Dennis and Pearson International Airport was postponed as a result of provincial funding cuts. It is the only LRT line that survived Rob Ford's cuts, albeit modified to include an extended underground section in the east and the removal of the western section. The eastern underground extension was revised back to a surface alignment in the 2012 transit vote. Currently, the  central and eastern sections are under construction with a projected completion date of 2022. The deferred western section to Pearson International Airport is currently under planning by Metrolinx and the Greater Toronto Airports Authority.

The following projects are undergoing environmental assessments with construction to begin after 2020 and be completed by 2030:
Jane LRT: A line running along Jane Street, from Pioneer Village station on the Yonge–University–Spadina subway line (east of the Jane/Steeles intersection), connecting with the Bloor–Danforth subway at (presumably) Jane station. This line would likely have been tunnelled for about 2 km from St. Clair Avenue to Bloor Street. This line was cancelled.
Don Mills LRT: A line running along Don Mills Road from Steeles Avenue, then through Don Mills station, then through East York Centre (Overlea Boulevard), where it would then follow the Leaside Bridge to Pape Avenue, and tunnel under Pape for about 2 km to Danforth (presumably at Pape station). As of 2019, the part of the line south of Eglinton Avenue is planned to be part of the Ontario Line.
Waterfront West LRT: A line along the western waterfront, running along Lake Shore Boulevard West from Long Branch GO Station eastward to the Exhibition Grounds, where it would continue eastwards along Fort York Boulevard and Bremner Street toward Union station.  This route was proposed since it passes densely built upcoming neighbourhoods and trip generators such as the Rogers Centre and the CN Tower. In January 2013, the project was cancelled by Toronto city officials. In 2015, a report titled Waterfront Transit Reset recommended a "reset" for this decision, due to a lack of a comprehensive plan for a transit network to respond to the rapid changes occurring around the waterfront. In 2017, a report about the Waterfront Transit Reset was presented to the TTC board. It included a number of recommendations to improve streetcar service along the lakeshore between Long Branch and Leslie Street. Should these recommendations regarding streetcar service between Long Branch and Union station be implemented, the resulting route would be similar to the Waterfront West LRT.
Scarborough Malvern LRT: A line running from Kennedy Station to the Morningside/Sheppard intersection near the Malvern neighbourhood via Eglinton Avenue East, Kingston Road and Morningside Avenue. The line would pass near the University of Toronto Scarborough (UTSC); it was believed that this line would commence operation much sooner since UTSC was a venue for the 2015 Pan American Games. In January 2016, the Scarborough Malvern LRT was renamed "Crosstown East" as the eastern extension for the Eglinton Crosstown line.

Scarborough RT
Part of the Transit City project was the revitalization of the existing Scarborough RT line. This project would extend the rapid transit line eastwards from its present terminus at McCowan station to three additional stops. The first proposed station was at Bellamy Road to serve the Consilium Place business area; the second was at Progress Avenue, east of Markham Road, to serve Centennial College Progress Campus. The line would then curve north to Sheppard Avenue East, connecting with the Sheppard East LRT. A new environmental class assessment is being made to further continue the line north into the neighbourhood of Malvern over a former railbed just east of Markham Road. In the future, an in-fill station may be added at Brimley Road.

The existing service is approaching the end of the operational life of its ICTS (intermediate capacity transit system) fleet; as trains are no longer built to that line's specification, a replacement is needed. While an upgraded form of ICTS (Mark II Vehicles designed by Bombardier) had been considered, the current recommendation is to implement the LRT/tram technology used for Transit City to save on the fleet and track maintenance costs currently incurred by this system which is unique within Toronto. All renovations and extension constructions are to be completed by 2020. However, under Rob Ford, the renovated and extended Scarborough RT was to become a part of the Eglinton Crosstown LRT instead and renamed Eglinton–Scarborough Crosstown line.

Bus rapid transit
The plan also called for the TTC to begin six new bus rapid transit (BRT) right-of-way lines once the tramline or light rail transit construction was complete. Some of these were meant to be temporary until a subway extension occurred while one of them is already in service. The proposed routes are:
along Ellesmere Road, from Scarborough Centre station to the Durham Region.
along Danforth Avenue and Kingston Road, from Victoria Park station to the Kingston Road/Eglinton Avenue intersection, where a station will be built connecting to the future Scarborough Malvern LRT line.
along Dundas Street, from Kipling station to Mississauga.
along Wilson Avenue, from Wilson station to Keele Street.
along Yonge Street, from Finch station to Richmond Hill.
York University Busway, connecting Downsview station to York University, which began service in 2009. 

The BRT routes were never realized or partially completed:

 York University Busway was partially built from Dufferin to Keele along Finch Hydro Corridor and with mixed traffic east of Dufferin and west of Keele. 939B Finch Express now uses the busway from Finch West Station to Dufferin and mixed traffic on Finch Avenue to Finch Station replacing the old 196 York University Express route south on Dufferin Street to Downsview Station.
 BRT route for Danforth-Kingston Road is partially within the 986 Scarborough Express but begins at Kennedy Station not Victoria Park Station. The route is offered during rush hour service only and is not a dedicated BRT.
 Dundas Street-Mississauga was never realized and replaced by Mississauga Transitway operated by MiWay. Only portions have BRT right-of-way with sections from Kipling to Renforth and west of Central Parkway to Erin Mills are in mixed traffic.
 Yonge-Richmond Hill was abandoned over Yonge extension plans.
 Ellesmere BRT is now Route 938 Highland Creek Express. The route is offered during rush hour service only and is not a dedicated BRT.
 Wilson BRT was is integrated into the 996 Wilson Express. The route is offered during rush hour service only and is not a dedicated BRT.

The York University Busway was suppose to stop service once the Spadina subway extension to Vaughan Metropolitan Centre station is complete but it has been repurposed. 

Likewise, creating a BRT line on Yonge Street depends on the fate of the proposed Yonge subway extension; if the subway extension is not approved, then work on the BRT line may commence.

Funding and costs
In April 2009, Finch West, Eglinton Crosstown, and the Scarborough RT upgrade and extension secured $7.2 billion in funding from the province, while the Sheppard East LRT has received $613 million in funding from the province, and $317 million in federal funding. In November 2007, the TTC provided an updated estimate of the costs of the proposal in its capital budget. The project cost to be paid by the Government of Ontario is $8.3 billion.

On 15 June 2007, the Government of Ontario announced its MoveOntario 2020 plan, which calls for a major overhaul and expansion of the Greater Toronto Area's transit systems, including the Transit City proposal, that will cost an estimated $17.5 billion in provincial and federal funding over a 12-year period. The provincial government proposed to provide two-thirds of the funds ($11.5 billion), and asked the federal government to pay the remaining one-third ($6 billion). However, Prime Minister Stephen Harper's government was not committed to this spending plan. The province's $17.5 billion MoveOntario 2020 plan calls for a total number of 52 transit projects in the GTA to be funded, with 95% of the projects completed by the year 2020.

Controversy
On 18 June 2009, Toronto Mayor David Miller requested federal funding from the Harper government's $12-billion stimulus spending to purchase new streetcars as part of the Transit City plan. The city faced a deadline of 27 June 2009 to commit to the $1.2-billion deal signed with Bombardier for the 204 streetcars. Miller and Ontario Premier Dalton McGuinty flew to Thunder Bay to announce their funding for the new streetcars, hoping to convince the Harper government to come up with its one-third share of the cost. Federal Transport Minister John Baird rejected the request outright. Baird stated that streetcar funding clearly failed to meet the stimulus bill's requirement that the funds would have to be spent in 2 years, as it was meant to put money into the economy quickly to buoy demand and stave off deflation, while Transit City was a long-term project. The stimulus also required funds to be spent on infrastructure in the municipality where the application is granted in order to create local employment, whereas the jobs created by building streetcars would be in Thunder Bay and not Toronto. Baird noted that Toronto was the only one of 2,700 applicants that did not meet the eligibility criteria.

On 25 March 2010, the Ontario provincial government announced their decision to postpone $4 billion of funding to Metrolinx for the MoveOntario 2020 project, which included funding for Transit City. Miller had expressed discontent and condemned McGuinty, who had earlier promised to provide full funding for Transit City in order for it to be built before the 2015 Pan American Games in Toronto.

The initial investment was to create approximately 100,000 jobs. The stated reason for the decision was a $21.3 billion deficit in the 2010 provincial operating budget. Standard economic metrics, however, show that as stimulus, Transit City adds significantly to provincial tax revenues, and given the province's 50-year amortization, the plan overall reduces Ontario's annual budget deficit. This caused widespread debate, protests and criticism of Premier McGuinty by politicians and local groups. As a result of the postponement, the plan has since been scaled down and expected completion dates have been further pushed back.

The delay in funding, according to Miller, meant that the priority LRT lines (Scarborough RT, Etobicoke–Finch West and Eglinton Crosstown) would not be able to meet their planned construction and opening dates; work on the Sheppard East line would proceed as its construction had already begun. Despite the controversy over the funding, Metrolinx negotiated a deal with Bombardier Transportation for a new fleet of trams or light rail vehicles which would be used on future Transit City lines.

Since the announcement, the City of Toronto and community groups began a lobbying campaign to restore funding, similar to the campaign leading to the initial funding. Mayor Miller condemned the funding delay and requested riders to contact their members of provincial parliament to have the government restore the funding. Other Transit City advocates petitioned and organized rallies to promote the immediate construction of the projects.

The Public Transit Coalition was launched by transit riders to counter the delay in Transit City funding. On 21 April 2010, the group held an event at the Toronto City Hall Council Chambers.

Economic effect
Transit City was expected to create approximately 200,000 new jobs in Ontario from $8.3 billion invested. This included operation, construction, and economic stimulus effect of spending. Unemployment reached 9% in 2010, the GTA's highest level since 1995.

The Ontario government's promised funding for Transit City would create short-term economic growth of $12.4 billion per year, adding in the near-term 2.1% to Ontario's GDP, according to the American Public Transportation Association.

According to the Federation of Canadian Municipalities research, Transit City was to produce a first-year GDP gain of $17.3 billion, were all the money to be spent in the first year. After five years the project adds $8.0 billion per year to GDP, with each $1 billion spent on transit adding 0.06% to Canada's GDP annually. This compares closely to US Congressional testimony, which shows infrastructure investment to stimulate annual GDP at a multiplier of 1.69 within one year, or $14 billion per year for Transit City. Both studies count direct impact of spending only.

In addition to this direct consequence, long-term indirect effects on business costs, productivity, and consumer spending from reduced congestion and travel costs create an additional $14.1 billion of value annually to Ontario's economy. Other indirect effects not measured are improved air quality and public health and reduced carbon emissions from extending rapid transit to 1.1 million more people.

Ontario taxes capture 12% of Ontario's GDP, meaning that Transit City's stimulus effect directly adds to provincial tax revenue. Transit City's direct economic impact of $12.4 billion per year nets the Ontario treasury $1.4 billion in annual tax revenue. Indirect effects on congestion and transportation costs produce an additional $1.7 billion per year in tax revenue. Government of Canada Bonds currently offer 4% interest for a 10-year term. Transit City's $8.3 billion expansion funding, if amortized over 10 years at prevailing bond rates, cost the province $1.2 billion per year.

See also
 Downtown Relief Line
 Toronto streetcar system
 Toronto subway

References

External links
 TTC Projects web page

 
Proposed Toronto rapid transit projects
Toronto Transit Commission